The Grand Exposition Coaster is a steel roller coaster located at Silver Dollar City in Branson, Missouri that opened in April 2006. It is believed to be a replacement of Runaway Ore Cart. The Grand Exposition Coaster was built by Zamperla of Italy as part of a new area of the park dubbed "The Grand Exposition". The ride consists of little more than a small drop and upwards helix, traversed by the train three times for each ride cycle.

Experience
Guests go through a short walkway, takes a left turn and into the station.  The ride immediately starts with a small incline.  After the crest, riders go through the small drop into the helix.  Riders then make a right-hand U-turn into the station. Due to the small layout, the ride goes 3 laps per cycle.

External links

Roller coasters in Missouri
Roller coasters introduced in 2006
Buildings and structures in Taney County, Missouri
Silver Dollar City
Roller coasters operated by Herschend Family Entertainment